The Green Valley of Russian River Valley AVA (formerly Sonoma County Green Valley AVA) is an American Viticultural Area in Sonoma County, California, United States. Located at the southwestern corner of the Russian River Valley AVA, its close proximity to the Pacific Ocean makes it one of the coolest appellations within Sonoma County.  The climate in the Green Valley is even cooler than other parts of the Russian River Valley, and favors the cultivation of cool climate varietals like Pinot noir, Chardonnay and Gewürztraminer.

History 
Green Valley was first designated as a wine region with the name Sonoma County Green Valley AVA on November 21, 1983, a name that was similar in structure to the Solano County Green Valley AVA created in 1982.  Many wines that could have been labelled with the Sonoma County Green Valley AVA designation were instead labelled with the broader appellation designation of the Russian River Valley AVA, due to the greater market awareness of Russian River Valley wines.  A group of wine producers from the region petitioned the United States Department of the Treasury Alcohol and Tobacco Tax and Trade Bureau for a name change to associate the Green Valley with the more popular Russian River Valley.  The name of the appellation was changed with an amendment to the federal law designating American Viticultural Areas, effective April 23, 2007, to be the Green Valley of Russian River Valley AVA.

See also
 Green Valley Creek
 Russian River (California)
 Sonoma County wine
 Wine Country (California)

References

External links

American Viticultural Areas
American Viticultural Areas of California
American Viticultural Areas of the San Francisco Bay Area
Geography of Sonoma County, California
1983 establishments in California